John Snell (died 1679) was  founder of the Snell Exhibitions at the University of Oxford.

John Snell may also refer to:

John Snell (MP for Stafford), Member of Parliament (MP) for Stafford 1390
John Snell (15th-century MP), MP for Winchester in 1402
John Snell (MP for Devizes) (died 1587), English politician
John Snell (died 1717) (1638–1717), MP for Exeter
John Snell (1682–1726), MP for Gloucester
John Abner Snell (1880–1936), American missionary surgeon and hospital administrator in China
John Snell (bowls) (born 1934), Australian international bowls player
John Snell (priest), Canon of Windsor, and Archdeacon of London
John Snell (electrical engineer) (1869–1938), English electrical engineer
John Snell (railway engineer) (1932–2014), former managing director of the Romney, Hythe and Dymchurch Railway

See also
John Blashford-Snell (born 1936), former British Army officer, explorer and author